Tomasz Górski may refer to:

Tomasz Górski (canoeist), Polish canoeist
Tomasz Górski (politician) (born 1973), Polish politician